Saʻd al-Ghāmidī (born 1967) is a Qāriʾ and an imam of the great holy mosque Masjid an-Nabawi. Al-Ghamdi has served as imam to Muslim communities across the globe.

Biography 
al-Ghāmidī was born in Dammam, Saudi Arabia in 1967. He memorized the entire Quran in 1990 when he was 22 years old. He is often noted for his acclaimed tajwīd. He studied Islamic law (Islamic Studies) in Dammam, particularly in the school of Sharia, the source of Muslim religious commandments. In 2012, he was appointed as the Imam of the Yousef bin Ahmed Kanoo Mosque in Dammam before having the same profession in several mosques around the world, including in the United States, the United Kingdom, and Austria.

During Ramadan 2009, Sheikh Saʻd al-Ghāmidī was an Imam during the Tarāwīḥ prayers in the al-Masjid an-Nabawi (Medina's Holy site of Islam) of Madinah.

See also 
 Saud As-Shuraim
 Abdulrahman Al-Sudais
 Yasser Al-Dosari
 Abdullah Awad Al-Juhany
 Maher Al-Mu'aiqly

References

External links 
 Quran recitation by Saad Al-Ghamidi on Google Play (free listening and free download)
 http://muflihun.com/recitations/SaadalGhamdi 
 https://quranicaudio.com/section/2

1967 births
Living people
Saudi Arabian Quran reciters
Saudi Arabian imams
Saudi Arabian Muslims
People from Dammam